Karl/Carl Wendling ([ventling]) (10 August 1875, Strasbourg – 27 March 1962, Stuttgart) was a German violinist and musical educator.

From 1902 on he was concertmaster at the Bayreuth Festival. In 1907 and 1908, he was concertmaster with the Boston Symphony Orchestra under Karl Muck. He had his own string quartet, "The Wendling Quartet". From 1909 on, he was a teacher at the Royal Stuttgart Conservatory, where he became director in 1929.

1875 births
1962 deaths
German violinists
German male violinists
Officers Crosses of the Order of Merit of the Federal Republic of Germany
Academic staff of the State University of Music and Performing Arts Stuttgart